Mehmet Şükrü Saracoğlu (17 June 1887, in Ödemiş – 27 December 1953, in Istanbul) was a Turkish politician, the fifth prime minister of Turkey and the Turkish Minister of Foreign Affairs during the early stages of World War II. He signed the German–Turkish Treaty of Friendship in 1941, which would prevent Turkish involvement in the war. He was also the chairman of the Turkish sports club Fenerbahçe S.K. for 16 years between 1934 and 1950, including holding that post concurrently with his time as Prime Minister from 1942 to 1946.

Early life

Born in Ödemiş in the Ottoman Empire in 1887, Mehmet Şükrü was the son of Saraç Mehmet Tevfik Usta who was from Akçaabat, Trabzon. He completed primary and middle school in Ödemiş and high school in the prestigious İzmir Atatürk Lisesi in İzmir and graduated from the School of Civil Service (Mekteb-i Mülkiye) halla in 1909.

For a while, he worked as officer of attendance and performed as mathematics teacher in İzmir High School in Sultaniye. In 1915, he studied in the Academy of Political Sciences in Geneva, Switzerland, for the account of İzmir.

During the Greco-Turkish War (1919–22) (the Western Front of the larger Turkish War of Independence), he returned to Turkey and fought in the region of Kuşadası, Aydın, and Nazilli.

Political career
He was elected to the Grand National Assembly of Turkey from İzmir in 1923. He was appointed as Minister of National Education in the cabinet of Prime Minister Fethi Okyar. He then presided over the Commission for Composite Population Exchange, which would conduct the negotiations with the Greek government later on. He was appointed as the Minister of Finance in the cabinet formed by Prime Minister İsmet Pasha (İnönü). After resigning, he was sent to the United States to complete some contacts about economic issues in 1931 and presided over the board going to the Paris Treaty of 1933 to solve the Ottoman public debt issue. In 1933, he reentered Cabinet as the Minister of Justice and performed as the Minister of Foreign Affairs in the second cabinet of Prime Minister Celal Bayar.

After the 1934 Surname Law, which required all Turkish citizens to adopt a surname, Mehmet Şükrü took on the surname "Saracoğlu", meaning "son of Saraç", Saraç being the epithet of his father.

In the closing days of World War II, he took part in the negotiations with the Soviet Union in Moscow for months.

Upon the death of Refik Saydam in 1942, he was assigned as the Prime Minister and resigned because of illness. He was elected as the President of the Grand National Assembly in 1948 and remained until 1950.

Later life
Saracoğlu, who retired from political life in 1950, was fluent in French and English. He was married and had three children.

He died on 27 December 1953.

The home of the Turkish football club Fenerbahçe, Şükrü Saracoğlu Stadium, is named after him.

See also
 13th government of Turkey

References

 Biography, Biyografi.info 
 BASVEKIL SUKRU SARACOGLU'NDAN ANILAR

External links
 

1887 births
1953 deaths
20th-century prime ministers of Turkey
People from Ödemiş
Mekteb-i Mülkiye alumni
Republican People's Party (Turkey) politicians
Ministers of Foreign Affairs of Turkey
Government ministers of Turkey
Prime Ministers of Turkey
Speakers of the Parliament of Turkey
Fenerbahçe S.K. presidents
Burials at Zincirlikuyu Cemetery
Ministers of Finance of Turkey
Ministers of National Education of Turkey
Ministers of the Interior of Turkey
Ministers of Justice of Turkey
Deputies of Izmir
Members of the 3rd government of Turkey
Members of the 5th government of Turkey
Members of the 6th government of Turkey
Members of the 7th government of Turkey
Members of the 8th government of Turkey
Members of the 9th government of Turkey
Members of the 10th government of Turkey
Members of the 11th government of Turkey
Members of the 12th government of Turkey
Members of the 13th government of Turkey
Members of the 14th government of Turkey